H. erecta may refer to:

 Haloragis erecta, the toatoa, a flowering plant species native to New Zealand

Synonyms
 Hypoxis erecta, a synonym for Hypoxis hirsuta, an ornamental plant native to the United States
 Hamelia erecta, a synonym for Hamelia patens, a large perennial shrub or small tree species native to the American subtropics and tropics

See also
 H. erectus (disambiguation)
 H (disambiguation)
 Erecta